Ewen William Alison (29 February 1852 – 6 June 1945) was a conservative politician who sat in both the House of Representatives (1902–1908) and the Legislative Council (1918–1932) of New Zealand.

Biography

He was born in Auckland on leap day in 1852.

He won the Auckland electorate of Waitemata in the 1902 general election, and held it to 1908, when he retired. In 1905 Alison had been associated with the breakaway New Liberal Party led initially by Harry Bedford and Francis Fisher, but had left the group before the election in December.

In 1918, Alison was appointed to the New Zealand Legislative Council. He was reappointed in 1925 and served until the expiry of his second term in 1932.

He died at his home in Takapuna on 6 June 1945.

Notes

References

New Zealand MPs for Auckland electorates
1852 births
1945 deaths
New Liberal Party (New Zealand) politicians
Members of the New Zealand Legislative Council
Members of the New Zealand House of Representatives
Independent MPs of New Zealand
Unsuccessful candidates in the 1911 New Zealand general election
Mayors of places in the Auckland Region